Nina Nasr Zanjani (born 1 September 1981 in Tehran, Iran) is an Iranian-Swedish actress. She played one of the two lead roles in Helena Bergström's directorial debut Mind the Gap as the daughter Yasmin.

Early life

Nina and her family moved from Iran to Sweden when she was six or seven years old. She grew up in Gråbo and lived there with her parents and brother. When she was 19-20, she settled in Stockholm to follow her career.

Zanjani was a student at Stockholm Elementary Theatre School (SET) from 2001 to 2002 and went to the Swedish National Academy of Mime and Acting in 2007. She participated in the sets of Royal Dramatic Theatre in Party and Woyzeck, and she played Josie in the Backa Theatre's acclaimed set of Rona Munro's Iron in 2005.

Career 
She played a leading role starring Helena Bergström's directorial debut Mind the Gap as the daughter named Yasmin. In November 2007, the play Don Carlos premiered at the Gothenburg City Theatre, where Zanjani played Queen Elizabeth. She also appeared in Night Rider by Björn Runge in the same theater, and in Nathan the Wise at the Stockholm City Theater and the SVT's dramatization of Selma Lagerlöf, which was aired on 26 and 27 December 2008.

Zanjani also had a starring role in Josef Fares' movie Balls (Swedish: Farsan) which premiered in February 2010. She also starred in all episodes of the second Swedish series of Wallander, where she played the role of police woman Isabelle Melin, at least until Indrivaren, where she ends his employment with the Ystad police.

She was even featured in the short film Knullträdet.

In autumn 2010, she took part in the performance of Clara's journey at the City Theatre in Gothenburg where she starred with the leading role of Clara. The critics and Zanjani acclaimed show that the 'theatrical thriller ". Clara's journey was voted the year's best performance by theater people and won a prestigious award in autumn 2010.

In 2012, she participated in the Gothenburg City Theatre's production of The Bible In 2014 she performed the role of Eliza in George Bernard Shaw's Pygmalion at the Gothenburg City Theatre.

Filmography
2006 - Paketet
2007 - Mind the Gap
2008 - Selma
2009 - Wallander – Hämnden
2009 - Wallander – Skulden
2009 - Wallander – Kuriren
2009 - Wallander – Tjuven
2009 - Wallander – Cellisten
2009 - Wallander – Prästen
2009 - Wallander – Läckan
2009 - Wallander – Skytten
2010 - Wallander – Dödsängeln
2010 - Balls
2010 - Wallander – Vålnaden
2010 - Wallander – Arvet
2010 - Wallander – Indrivaren
2010 - Superhjälten (The Superhero)
2010 - Home for Christmas
2011 - Elegia
2013 - Hotell
2013 - Barna Hedenhös uppfinner julen (TV series)
2020 - Agent Hamilton (TV series)

Theatre

Roles

References

External links

Swedish actresses
1981 births
Living people
Iranian emigrants to Sweden
Actresses from Tehran